Association Sportive et Culturelle HLM is a Senegalese football club based in Dakar. They play in the top division in Senegalese football. Their home stadium is Stade de ASC HLM.

Achievements
Senegal Premier League: 0

Senegal FA Cup: 1
 2012.

Coupe de la Ligue: 0

Senegal Assemblée Nationale Cup: 0

Performance in CAF competitions
West African Club Championship (UFOA Cup): 1 appearance
2009 - runners-up

Squad

Football clubs in Senegal
Sports clubs in Dakar